Antoine Varlet (1 August 1893 – 17 November 1940) was a Belgian architect. He specialised in luxury apartment buildings in Beaux-Arts and later Art Deco styles.

Biography 
Antoine Varlet was, with Michel Polak [fr] and Sta Jasinski [fr], one of the pioneers of apartment building construction in Brussels. His name appeared for the first time in the Brussels landscape in 1923 for an industrial complex at 42, rue de la Gare/Stationstraat in Etterbeek, in collaboration with his brother, the architect W. Varlet. Still in 1923, they renovated a neoclassical building together at 27, rue de l'Est/Ooststraat. In 1927, he signed his first apartment building at 110, avenue de Tervueren/Tervurenlaan.

Varlet was a follower, like his colleague Pierre De Groef [fr], of the Beaux-Arts style in the middle of the Art Deco era. However, he quickly turned from 1929 onwards to an Art Deco style mixed with elements of Beaux-Arts. His specialty was makings buildings at street corners which give a wider perspective, a practice which has served as a precedent for many architects in Brussels since then. As he died young and did not participate after the war in the blossoming of apartment buildings, his work, which marks the Brussels landscape, has not yet been the subject of an in-depth study.

Beaux-Arts era
 1927: Avenue de Tervueren/Tervurenlaan 110
 1928: Robert Schuman Roundabout 8–9
 1929: Avenue de Cortenbergh/Kortenberglaan 43, corner with Avenue de la Renaissance/Renaissancelaan 1

Art Deco era
Starting in 1929, his style became influenced by the then dominant Art Deco style, while still keeping many Beaux-Arts elements in his works: red or orange brick facades, bordered with white stones, forged iron doors, decorative low and high reliefs, which help mitigate a coldness that is sometimes found in Art Deco buildings. He thus created his own mix of styles.

 1929: Avenue de l'Hippodrome/Renbaanlaan 1, corner with Avenue des Klauwaerts/Klauwaartslaan 2
 1930: Avenue Franklin Roosevelt/Franklin Rooseveltlaan 82–84, corner with Avenue de l'Orée/Zoomlaan
 1931: Avenue Franklin Roosevelt 110, corner with Avenue des Scarabées/Keverslaan
 1933: Avenue Louise/Louizalaan 105, corner with Rue Blanche/Blanchestraat
 1934: Avenue Louise 142
 1935: Avenue de la Toison d'Or/Gulden Vlieslaan 66–66a
 Rue de la Loi/Wetstraat 83

See also
 List of Belgian architects

References

Further reading
 « Quelques immeubles de l'architecte A. Varlet », in : Perspectives, 1, 1937, pp. 44–46.
 Clarté, mensuel, n°11, Brussels, 1936, p. 11.
 Catalogue of buildings by architect A. Varlet, Ern. Thill, Brussels, 1936. Read online.
 Isabelle Douillet and Cécile Schaack, « L’avenue Franklin Roosevelt et le quartier du Solbosch : Considérations historiques, urbanistiques et architecturales », Inventaire du Patrimoine architectural, Bruxelles-Extensions Sud, 2006–2007. Read online.
 Isabelle Douillet and Cécile Schaack, « L’avenue Louise et les rues adjacentes : Considérations historiques, urbanistiques et architecturales », Inventaire du Patrimoine architectural, Bruxelles-Extensions Sud, 2006–2007. Read online .

External links
 Works of Antoine Varlet in the « Patrimone monumental de Belgique »
 Catalogue of buildings by architect Antoine Varlet with interior pictures, 1936, 21 pages.
 Antoine Varlet on ReflexCity.net
 Antoine Varlet on pss-archi.eu

Belgian architects
Beaux Arts architects
Art Deco architects
1893 births
1940 deaths